Pinnacles Station is a pastoral lease that once operated as a cattle station and now operates as a sheep station in Western Australia.

The station surrounds the now abandoned town of Lawlers; it shares boundaries with Leinster Downs Station to the north, as well as Dandarraga, Sturt Meadows and Ida Valley Stations to the south.

Pinnacles was established in 1896 by Messrs Routledge, Morris and Willis. Droughts followed but in 1909 it experienced the best season since 1896, with wildflowers blooming across the grazing lands and 300 cattle being overlanded down from the Kimberley region.

It was acquired by Mr. A. Geerling, who continued to breed cattle on the run and make improvements to make it ready to stock with sheep. By 1925 the property had been acquired by Hawker, Chomley and Co., who were expanding neighbouring Sturt Meadows Station and were stocking both with sheep from the eastern states. By the following year it had changed hands again, Messrs Manifold, Black and McKenna purchasing Pinnacles for £30,000. The company formed by the group, Pinnacles Proprietary Limited, appointed a new manager named McKinnon to run the  station, which had recently had a new homestead constructed and was building a new shearing shed. Other improvements included 55 equipped wells,  of fencing and a telephone line. The property was stocked with 7,000 sheep and 2,000 head of cattle. It was estimated the run would be capable of supporting a flock of 40,000 sheep. In 1928 the flock had grown to 10,000 sheep.

An aerodrome had been built on the property at some time prior to 1939. In the same year the area was flooded following heavy rains. For the next four years the area was struck by drought. The McKinnon family eventually acquired Pinnacles and retained possession until 1987 when the family sold it.

See also
List of ranches and stations
List of pastoral leases in Western Australia

References

Homesteads in Western Australia
Pastoral leases in Western Australia
Stations (Australian agriculture)
Goldfields-Esperance
1896 establishments in Australia